Chui A-poo (died 1851) was a 19th-century Qing Chinese pirate who commanded a fleet of more than 50 junks in the South China Sea.  He was one of the two most notorious South China Sea pirates of the era, along with Shap Ng-tsai.

In September 1849, his fleet, which was based in Bias Bay east of Hong Kong, was defeated by British and Chinese warships. More than 400 pirates were killed and Chui was seriously wounded.
Although he managed initially to escape, he was betrayed by his own crew and handed over to the British authorities. He was wanted with a bounty of £500 for the murder of two British officers. His punishment was lifelong exile to Van Diemen's Land (now Tasmania), but he hanged himself in his cell before it could be carried out.

See also
Battle of Tysami

Notes and references 

May be the namesake of the One Piece character Scratchmen Apoo.

Further reading 
 
 

1851 deaths
19th-century Chinese people
19th-century pirates
Chinese pirates
Suicides by hanging in China
Chinese people who died in prison custody
Prisoners who died in British military detention
People who committed suicide in prison custody
Year of birth unknown
1850s suicides